Lee County High School (LCHS) is a senior high school in Beattyville, Kentucky. It is a part of Lee County School District.

References

External links
 Lee County High School
 

Education in Lee County, Kentucky
Public high schools in Kentucky
Beattyville, Kentucky